Tiankun-1 (also known as TK-1) is a Chinese experimental technology demonstration satellite developed, operated, and launched by China Aerospace Science and Industry Corporation (CASIC). It was launched on March 2, 2017, and is designed in order to test its satellite bus, as well as small satellite operations.

Design 
Tiankun-1 is a small satellite designed to test technologies meant for satellites of such sizes, as well as experiment with the operation of small satellites. With its small launch vehicles, China hopes to be able to get a share in the international small satellite launch market.

Tiankun-1's mission is to test out its satellite bus and performance in orbit. It would also be used for testing remote sensing and telecommunications technologies, as well as test out minisatellite-based experiments and operations. It is the first spacecraft to be developed by the CASIC as part of its plans to expand its commercial space plans.

Launch 
Tiankun-1 was launched on board a Kaituozhe-2 rocket, which is a then-new small launch vehicle. It launched from Jiuquan Satellite Launch Center on March 2, 2017, at 07:53 CST (23:53 UTC) into a polar orbit. It was the Kaituozhe-2's first launch, and its first successful one.

References 

2017 in spaceflight
Spacecraft launched in 2017
Satellites in low Earth orbit
Technology demonstration satellites
Satellites of China